The Marquette Golden Eagles men's ice hockey team is a college ice hockey program that represents Marquette University. They are a member of the American Collegiate Hockey Association at the Division II level. The university sponsored varsity ice hockey from 1922 to 1933.

History
Marquette was one of several midwestern colleges to found a varsity hockey program in the early 1920s. The Blue and Gold began playing in 1922 and rose to the top of their field, twice winning the Western Intercollegiate Championship. As was common with many schools of the era, Marquette's team suffered with the vagaries of weather and a series of warm winters in the early 30s put the program in jeopardy. Unfortunately, this was also a period where funding was lacking due to the great depression and Marquette suspended their program in 1933. Many other schools were forced to stop playing under similar circumstances, however, most eventually restarted their programs.

Marquette did rekindle their team in 1969 after a new rink was finished. However, the school never promoted the team above club status and the Golden Eagles remain at that level (as of 2021).

Season-by-season results

Note: GP = Games played, W = Wins, L = Losses, T = Ties, Pts = Points

* Winning percentage is used when conference schedules are unbalanced.

Golden Eagles in the NHL

References

External links
Official site

Marquette Golden Eagles
Marquette Golden Eagles men's ice hockey
Ice hockey teams in Wisconsin
1922 establishments in Wisconsin
Ice hockey clubs established in 1922